
Zzxjoanw is a fictitious entry in an encyclopedia which fooled logologists for many years. It referred to a purported Māori word meaning "drum", "fife", or "conclusion".

Origin
In 1903, author Rupert Hughes published The Musical Guide, an encyclopedia of classical music. Among its many sections was a "pronouncing and defining dictionary of terms, instruments, etc." The dictionary, 252 pages in all, explained the meaning and gave the pronunciation of German, Italian, and other non-English words found in the terminology of classical music.

The entry was retained when the book was republished under different titles in 1912 and 1939.

Analysis and discovery as likely hoax
Zzxjoanw attracted interest from logologists who wrote about it with a mixture of intrigue and skepticism. Helene and Charlton Laird included it in their 1957 book The Tree of Language, noting that "perhaps Mr. Hughes is having his little joke, since the word doesn't appear in any other dictionary we've consulted". Dmitri Borgmann included the term in his 1965 book, Language on Vacation: An Olio of Orthographical Oddities:

In 1974, Mrs. Byrne's Dictionary of Unusual, Obscure, and Preposterous Words, while accepting the word's meaning as a "Māori drum", rejected Hughes' pronunciation of "shaw", proposing a somewhat different version: "ziks-jo'an".

Philip M. Cohen first published about zzxjoanw as a potential hoax in a 1976 issue of Word Ways. He highlighted its pronunciation, its unlikely connection to the spelling, its wide variety of meanings, and that one of those meanings, "conclusion", also happened to conclude the reference work in which it appeared. He also pointed to its unlikely Māori origin, because "Maori has no closed syllables or consonant clusters, let alone the conglomerations of 'zzxjoanw', nor even an 's' or 'sh' sound. The available Maori dictionaries give words for 'drum' and 'end', but they haven't the slightest resemblance to 'zzxjoanw' or 'shaw. Ross Eckler picked up Cohen's critique in his 1996 book Making the Alphabet Dance, speculating that Hughes may have "expected it to be obvious, but he did not take into account the credulity of logologists, sensitized by dictionary-sanctioned outlandish words such as mlechchha and qaraqalpaq."

The book You Say Tomato: An Amusing and Irreverent Guide to the Most Often Mispronounced Words in the English Language, published in 2005, appears to take the word seriously.

References

Bibliography

External links
 The original 1903 entry, from Google Books

Fictitious entries
1900s neologisms
Musical hoaxes
1900s hoaxes
Linguistic hoaxes
Māori language
Hoaxes in New Zealand